Walter Hillyar Colquhoun Long (20 October 1858 – 18 February 1892) was a British Second Lieutenant who fought in the First Boer War. He was originally a second lieutenant in the 6th Dragoons, but was then transferred to the 94th Regiment of Foot on 27 March 1880. As part of the 94th Regiment, he played a crucial part in the defence of Lydenburg during a three month siege in 1881. He was the son of the British politician Walter Long. He took his life at the Grosvenor Hotel, Buckingham Palace Road, Westminster, after being court-martialled and criticised for his conduct of the defence of Lydenburg.

References

British military personnel of the First Boer War
1858 births
1892 deaths
Dolforgan Estate
6th (Inniskilling) Dragoons officers
Connaught Rangers officers
Burials at Brompton Cemetery
Military personnel from London
People educated at Eton College
Suicides in Westminster
Suicides by jumping in England
British military personnel who committed suicide